Mixed Magic is a 1936 American short comedy film starring Buster Keaton.

Cast
 Buster Keaton as Elmer 'Happy' Butterworth
 Eddie Lambert as Professor Spumoni
 Marlyn Stuart as Mary
 Ed Hall
 Jimmie Fox (as Jimmy Fox)
 Walter Fenner
 Pass Le Noir
 Harry Myers

See also
 Buster Keaton filmography

External links

 Mixed Magic at the International Buster Keaton Society

1936 films
1936 comedy films
1936 short films
20th Century Fox films
American black-and-white films
Educational Pictures short films
Films directed by Buster Keaton
Films about magic and magicians
American comedy short films
1930s American films